Qara may refer to:

Places
Al Qara, a governorate in Al Bahah Region, Saudi Arabia
Qara, Syria, a Syrian city
Qara Oasis, Egypt

Persons
Qara Iskander, ruled the Kara Koyunlu or Black Sheep Turcoman tribe from 1420 to 1436
Qara Mahammad Töremish, bey of Kara Koyunlu and father of Qara Yusuf
Qara Osman (reigned 1378–1435), late 14th and early 15th-century leader of the Turkoman tribal federation of Aq Qoyunlu in what is now eastern Turkey, Iran, Azerbaijan and Iraq
Qara Shemsi Abdal, a 19th-century Ottoman poet
Qara Yusuf (c. 1356 – 1420), ruler of the Kara Koyunlu dynasty or Black Sheep Turkomans from c.1388 to 1420

See also
Qara Khitai
Ghara, disambiguation